The Xiphocentronidae are a family of caddisflies. It has previously been treated as a subfamily of Psychomyiidae, and has a broad distribution, including parts of Asia, Central Africa and the Americas. It contains seven genera, in two subfamilies:
Proxiphocentroninae Schmid, 1982 
Proxiphocentron Schmid, 1982
Xiphocentroninae Ross, 1949 
Abaria Mosely, 1948
Cnodocentron Schmid, 1982
Drepanocentron Schmid, 1982
Machairocentron Schmid, 1982
Melanotrichia Ulmer, 1906
Xiphocentron Brauer, 1870

References

Trichoptera families